Burdunellus (meaning "little mule", possibly a nickname) was a Roman usurper of the late fifth century AD, recorded only briefly in the Consularia Caesaraugustana. Under 496 it is recorded that "he became a tyrant in Hispania", a phrase which, in the political language of the time and considering the nature of the source, must mean he tried to claim the imperial dignity and authority. He was eventually abandoned by his own supporters, who turned him over to legitimate authorities and sent him to Tolosa, where he was burned to death inside a bronze bull, an unusual fate for a usurper but designed to humiliate. The location of Burdunellus' petty government is unknown, but was probably the valley of the Ebro centred on Caesaraugusta.

Notes

Sources

Collins, Roger. Visigothic Spain, 409–711. Oxford: Blackwell Publishing, 2004. . 
Thompson, E. A. "The End of Roman Spain: Part III." Nottingham Mediaeval Studies, xxii (1978), pp. 3–22. Reprinted as "The Gothic Kingdom and the Dark Age of Spain" in Romans and Barbarians: The Decline of the Western Empire. Madison: University of Wisconsin Press, 1982. pp. 161–187. .

5th-century Roman usurpers
496 deaths
5th century in Hispania
Year of birth unknown
People executed by boiling